Romance of the Three Kingdoms, known as Sangokushi in Japan, is a 1985 video game published by Koei. It is the first game in the Romance of the Three Kingdoms series. Originally released on the PC-88, it was ported to numerous platforms, including the PC-98, MSX, Nintendo Entertainment System (1988), Amiga, MS-DOS, FM-7, Sharp X1, Sharp X68000, WonderSwan, Windows (2003) and mobile phones.

Gameplay
Romance of the Three Kingdoms is a game in which the player governs the provinces of China.

Reception
In Computer Gaming World, the game was reviewed by Dungeons & Dragons creator Dave Arneson, who wrote that it is "a great historical simulation and will keep players at their keyboards for many a night in order to win their empires. It has economics, intrigue, bribery, covert action, diplomacy, war, and more! There are many ways beyond simple conquest to accomplish one's goals." He concluded: "I most heartily recommend Romance to all serious game players out there."

In December 1989, Computer Gaming World readers gave it an average rating of 8.96 out of 10, making it the magazine's 13th highest user-rated game at the time. In 1990 and 1993 surveys of historical strategy and war games, the magazine gave Romance of the Three Kingdoms three-plus stars out of five.

Reviews
The Games Machine - Dec, 1989
ASM (Aktueller Software Markt) - Mar, 1990
Computer Gaming World - Oct, 1990
Nintendo Power Magazine - Sep, 1989

References

External links
Review in Info

1985 video games
Amiga games
DOS games
FM-7 games
Koei games
Mobile games
MSX games
Nintendo Entertainment System games
NEC PC-8801 games
NEC PC-9801 games
Romance of the Three Kingdoms (video game series)
Sharp X1 games
Super Nintendo Entertainment System games
Video games developed in Japan
Video games scored by Yoko Kanno
Windows games
WonderSwan games
X68000 games